Veris (formerly OTOC) is a spatial data services company in Australia.
It is said to be the largest provider of spatial data services.

History
Ocean to Outback Electrical was formed in 2003 by Adam Lamond and Ocean to Outback Contracting (OTOC) was established in 2008. It renamed to Veris in November 2016.

Projects
 Metro Tunnel Project
 WA Museum Boola Bardip
 Sunbury Line Upgrade
 Sydney Light Rail
 Epping Chatswood Rail Link
 Timbertop Estate
 Perth Airport
 Hydro Tasmania
 Launceston Model
 Australia 108

References

Engineering consulting firms of Australia
Companies listed on the Australian Securities Exchange
Service companies of Australia
Business services companies established in 2008
Australian companies established in 2008